Colin Pearce Davey (29 June 1927 – 20 July 2013) was an Australian rules footballer who played with Collingwood in the Victorian Football League (VFL).

Notes

External links 

Profile on Collingwood Forever

1927 births
2013 deaths
Australian rules footballers from Western Australia
Collingwood Football Club players
Subiaco Football Club players